Johannes Meyer may refer to:

Johannes Meyer (actor) (1884–1972), Danish film actor
Johannes Meyer (director) (1888–1976), German screenwriter and film director
Johannes Meyer (rugby union) (born 1981), Namibian rugby player
Johannes Meyer (British politician), British politician and MP for Downton
Johannes Meyer (Estonian politician), Estonian politician representing the German-Baltic Party

See also
 Hans May (1886–1958), Austrian composer born Johannes Mayer
 Johanne Meyer (1838–1915), Danish suffragist, pacifist and journal editor
 Johannes Mayer (1893–1963), German general